Alyaksandr Dzegtseraw (born 20 March 1986) is a Belarusian former professional footballer.

Honours
Naftan Novopolotsk
Belarusian Cup winner: 2008–09

External links

1986 births
Living people
Belarusian footballers
Belarusian expatriate footballers
Expatriate footballers in Russia
Association football midfielders
FC Lokomotiv Moscow players
FC Torpedo Moscow players
FC Naftan Novopolotsk players
FC Torpedo-BelAZ Zhodino players
FC Vitebsk players
FC Belshina Bobruisk players
FC Smorgon players
FC Slonim-2017 players
FC Orsha players
FC Baranovichi players
Sportspeople from Vitebsk